Daniel O'Connor is an Australian television actor and singer.

He was one of the top 12 finalists in the 2004 series of Network Ten's reality talent contest programme Australian Idol, aired on Network Ten nationwide in Australia, finishing eleventh.  He then launched an acting career, appearing as Ned Parker on the soap opera Neighbours.

Australian Idol
O'Connor auditioned for Australian Idol in Sydney. He auditioned with the church classic, "I Surrender All" written by Judson W. Van DeVenter. All 3 judges were thrilled by an impressive performance. Despite Dicko's dislike of religious songs, he gave O'Connor a 'yes' along with Mark and Marcia sending him into the top 100. Later, Dicko advised O'Connor to change to songs that would influence the "world" to vote for him.

During O'Connor's Top 30 performance, he performed "Amazing" by Josh Kelley. The judges were impressed by a fine performance and so were the voting public as he was voted into the Final 12. Also put through to the Final 12 from his group of ten, were Casey Donovan and Ricki-Lee Coulter.

During his Australian Idol journey, O'Connor showed an ability to work the crowd and to dress for the occasion. However, he was told on numerous occasions by Dicko that he did not have a superstar voice. O'Connor was eliminated from Australian Idol on 13 September 2004, placing him in 11th position.

Acting
O'Connor has appeared in the mobile soap opera, Random Place where he played the character of Bo Edwards. The series was viewed via mobile phones and provided a fly-on-the-wall view of the lives of five twenty-somethings sharing a house near Bondi Beach. This was Australia's first mobile soap opera, a format which originated in the Netherlands.

O'Connor then took on a regular role as Ned Parker in the soap opera Neighbours. In his three years in the show, his character had several relationships, was mistakenly believed to be homosexual, discovered he had a son, and survived a fire. In one particular scene, he was pictured half-naked with a towel around his waist. "I actually thought I had to be completely naked," he explained when he was told he had to drop the towel. "Ever since that scene, I've had a lot of people who want me to take my shirt off!"'.

He did a cameo in Ricki-Lee Coulter's Can't Touch It music video in 2007, as a bartender and her love interest. He has also appeared on Ready Steady Cook, Thank God You're Here and Australia's Brainiest quiz show among other things. Having left Neighbours, he appeared in CelebAir, but was evicted in the 7th week.
In Autumn 2011 he appeared in BBC One's Death in Paradise Episode 2

In December 2011 it was announced that O'Connor had joined the cast of British soap opera Hollyoaks as Ally Gorman. He left the show in late 2012.

References

External links
 

Australian Idol participants
Australian male television actors
Australian people of Irish descent
Living people
21st-century Australian singers
Year of birth missing (living people)